The 1970–71 Football League Cup was the 11th season of the Football League Cup, a knock-out competition for England's top 92 football clubs. The tournament started on 17 August 1970 and ended with the final at Wembley on 27 February 1971.

Tottenham Hotspur won the tournament after defeating Aston Villa in the final at Wembley Stadium, London.
This was to be the last season in which it wasn't compulsory to enter the tournament. The only team who did not enter in 1970–71 was Everton, the previous season's league champions. After 1971–72 entry to the tournament became compulsory.

Calendar
Of the 91 teams, 37 received a bye to the second round (teams ranked 2nd–38th in the 1969–70 Football League) and the other 54 played in the first round. Semi-finals were two-legged.

First round

Ties

Replays

Second round

Ties

Replays

Second Replay

Third round

Ties

Replays

Fourth round

Ties

Replays

Fifth Round

Ties

Replays

Semi-finals

First Leg

Second Leg

Final

The final was held at Wembley Stadium, London on 27 February 1971.

References

General

Specific

1970–71
1970–71 domestic association football cups
Lea
Cup